"The Kiss of Death" is the ninth episode of seventh season of the British BBC anthology TV series Play for Today. The episode was a television play that was originally broadcast on 11 January 1977. "The Kiss of Death" was written and directed by Mike Leigh, produced by David Rose, and starred David Threlfall.

Mike Leigh directed "this whimsical tale about Trevor, (David Threlfall), an unusually bashful mortician's assistant", whose moods and personality really make up the subject of the film. A natural landscape for Leigh's offbeat and bleakly humorous worldview. Leigh has often said the film is one of his favourites, not least because Trevor contains certain autobiographical elements.

Trevor and his friend Ronnie form a foursome with Linda and Sandra. A brake on Trevor's joy in life "is the factual premonition of everyday death", and the central incident of a cot death affects him profoundly.

Cast
 David Threlfall as Trevor
 Clifford Kershaw as Mr Garside
 John Wheatley as Ronnie
 Angela Curran as Sandra
 Kay Adshead as Linda

Critical responses
"The Kiss of Death" is highly regarded by the critic Michael Coveney, who wrote in a 1996 study of Leigh's work : "The kissing part of "The Kiss of Death" is an extraordinary scene. Linda and Trevor are on a sofa, she chewing away, he nervously amused but not exactly apprehensive...The playing of Kay Adshead and David Threlfall indicates every stage of this sexual jousting match with faultless accuracy and perception. We glimpse ... an entire catalogue of human emotions in the mating game: anxiety, cruelty, affection, wonder, contempt and playfulness. This is how love scenes are endured in life, not in the movies, but distilled and refined for this movie."

References

External links
 

1977 British television episodes
1977 television plays
British television plays
Films directed by Mike Leigh
Films scored by Carl Davis
Play for Today